Robert, Rob, Bob or Bobby Reeves may refer to:

Performers
Bob Reeves (actor) (1892–1960), American lead in silents and later bit player
Rob Reeves, English guitarist for 1999–2004 Defenestration (band)
Bobby Reeves (singer), American 2000s vocalist for Adema and LEVEL

Others
Robert Reeves, Australian mayor of Geelong in 1872
Bobby Reeves (baseball) (1904–1993), American infielder
Robert Reeves, American astrophotographer since 1958, asteroid 26591 Robertreeves is named after him
Robert Reeves (author), American literary critic, short story writer and novelist since 1970

See also
Robert Campbell Reeve (1902–1980), American founder of Reeve Aleutian Airways